Collonges station is a railway station in the commune of Collonges-lès-Premières, in the French department of Côte-d'Or, in the Bourgogne-Franche-Comté region. It is an intermediate stop on the Dijon–Vallorbe line of SNCF. The high-speed LGV Rhin-Rhône to Besançon diverges east of the station.

Services
The following services stop at Collonges:

References

External links 
 
 

Railway stations in Côte-d'Or